U.S. Route 97 (US 97) is a United States Numbered Highway, stretching from Weed, California to the Canadian border in Oroville, Washington. The California portion of US 97 runs north from I-5 in Weed to the Oregon state line. This is the majority of a shortcut between I-5 and Klamath Falls, Oregon, added to both states' state highway systems in 1931. It was designated as US 97 in 1935, replacing an east–west section in southern Oregon.

Route description
US 97 begins in Weed at an interchange with Interstate 5. It runs on Weed's Business Loop of Interstate 5, which all of the loop used to be U.S. Route 99. At the junction with California State Route 265, U.S. Route 97 ends its concurrency with the Business Loop and turns right, heading to the northeast into the Shasta-Trinity National Forest, and later the Klamath National Forest. US 97 passes by Grass Lake as it travels through the mountains before descending into the community of Macdoel. The route continues into the city of Dorris before intersecting with California State Route 161 near Indian Tom Lake before it crosses the Oregon state border and leaves California.

US 97 is part of the California Freeway and Expressway System, and is part of the National Highway System, a network of highways that are considered essential to the country's economy, defense, and mobility by the Federal Highway Administration. US 97 is eligible for the State Scenic Highway System, but it is not officially designated as a scenic highway by the California Department of Transportation. US 97 is also part of the Volcanic Legacy Scenic Byway, an All-American Road.

History

US 97 was created in 1926 and originally terminated near Ashland, Oregon, but was extended from Klamath Falls to Weed in 1935.

In 2002, Caltrans allocated $23.7 million to construct a  bypass of Dorris to carry US 97 traffic, replacing a set of city streets with three turns that caused tractor trailers to flip over. The proposal was rejected by the city government in 2003 due to fears it would affect business traffic, which had already been struggling in Dorris.

Major intersections

See also

References

External links

California @ AARoads.com - U.S. Route 97
Caltrans: Route 97 highway conditions
California Highways: US 97

 California
97
U.S. Route 97